is a Kōyasan Betsuin (affiliate temple) located in Aomori, Aomori Prefecture. The temple was founded by a Great Acharya , who later built  in 1984. Roughly 21.35 meters in height, it is the tallest seated bronze figure of Buddha in Japan.

See also
List of tallest statues

References

External links
Official Website 

Shingon Buddhism
Buddhist temples in Aomori Prefecture
Aomori (city)
Outdoor sculptures in Japan
Kōyasan Shingon temples